The OTO Mod. 42 is an incendiary anti-tank hand grenade supplied to the Royal Italian Army during World War II.

History 
The Royal Army had entered the war without an anti-tank bomb of national production. Only when the war began, in 1942, two models were built: the Breda Mod. 42 and the OTO Mod. 42.

Features 
The fuze consist of a normal OTO Mod. 35 hand grenade that is internally threaded and screwed to an aluminum handle which connects to the body bomb. The body is a glass container loaded with flamethrower liquid and gasoline, which shattered upon impact or at the moment of activation of the detonator. The project comes from handmade explosives built on the field by soldiers joining a normal OTO Mod. 35 with bottles filled with flammable liquid.

The staff was trained to hit the air vents of the tank's engine, in order to make penetrate the incendiary liquid before ignition.

See also 
 OTO Mod. 35
 Regio Esercito

External links 
 http://www.talpo.it/o.t.o..html
 http://army1914-1945.org.pl/wlochy2/regio-esercito/uzbrojenie-wyposazenie-i-sprzet-regio-esercito/bron-strzelecka/229-przeciwpancerny-granat-zapalajacy-oto-mod-42-regio-esercito (Polish)

Grenades of Italy
World War II infantry weapons of Italy